Baldy Lake is a lake in the east-central part of the Canadian province of Saskatchewan in Narrow Hills Provincial Park. It is situated in the Cub Hills and the boreal forest ecozone of Canada.

Baldy Lake is accessed from a secondary road that branches off from the Hanson Lake Road. It is east of the larger Stickley Lake and is surrounded by a forest of mature jack pine. The lake's outflow is a short stream that flows west into Stickley Lake, which in turn flows south into Upper Fishing Lake. Upper Fishing Lake is along the course of Caribou Creek, which flows into Lower Fishing Lake and eventually on to the Saskatchewan River via Stewart Creek and Torch River.

Recreation 
Baldy Lake Campground is a small campground located at the northern end of the lake that is RV accessible with five non-electric campsites. At the campground, there's access to the lake, a boat launch, picnic tables, a fishing cleaning station, and fire pits. It is one of four campgrounds in the Narrow Hills Provincial Park that are RV accessible. The other three are located at Lower Fishing Lake, Zeden Lake, and Ispuchaw Lake.

Fish species 
Fish commonly found in the lake include walleye and northern pike.

See also 
List of lakes of Saskatchewan
List of protected areas of Saskatchewan
Tourism in Saskatchewan
Hudson Bay drainage basin

References 

Lakes of Saskatchewan
Northern Saskatchewan Administration District